John Peter Grant, 13th Earl of Dysart  (born 22 October 1946), styled Lord Huntingtower from 2003 to 2011, also known as Johnnie Grant, is a Scottish peer and landowner. Together with his son James, he is responsible for Rothiemurchus, in the Scottish Highlands, including part of Rothiemurchus Forest and Braeriach, which at 4252 ft (1296 m) is the third highest mountain in Britain.

Dysart is the son of Lt Col John Peter Grant, MBE 16th of Rothiemurchus, and his wife Lady Katherine, née Greaves. 
In 1971, Dysart married Philippa Chance MBE, by whom he has three children:
Louisa Katherine Lindsay (b. 1975)
James Patrick Grant, (b. 1977)
Alexandra Rose Grant (b. 1985)

Since 1975 Philippa worked in partnership with her husband in developing Rothiemurchus from a traditional highland estate to the present operation, which involves approximately fifty team members working in a complex, multiple land-use business. Rothiemurchus is the first estate in Britain to achieve the Investors in People standard. They welcome between 300,000 and 500,000 visitors annually and work in close partnership with a large variety of public agencies to ensure the sustainable use and development of this special area in The Cairngorms National Park. 

She was awarded an MBE for services to NHS Scotland. 

She also had a long and close involvement with rural development in the North of Scotland, particularly through community action. 

She was a founder and director of Moray, Badenoch and Strathspey Enterprise Co. Ltd. 

As the first chair of Highland Community Care Forum, an independent organization made up of a network of users of services, their carers, and voluntary organisations who wish to see the highest possible standards of cost-effective community care provided throughout the Highlands. The Princess Royal Trust for Carers Highland carers project is one of the innovative and practical ideas that H.C.C.F. developed. 

As a Member of the Scottish Tourist Board, one of her responsibilities was to chair the National Tourist Signposting working group where she oversaw the re-design of Scotland's brown road signs. 

Philippa was Director of Maggie's Centre Highland 2000-2015; Director and Chair of Cairngorms Chamber of Commerce/ Cairngorms Business Partnership; 1999-2001 Member of the Clinical Standards Board for Scotland which is a Special Health Board; 1995- 1998 member of various Prince's Trust committees; Member of the Scottish Careers Service Consultation Group; 1994 -1997 Member of the Rural Commission of the Scottish Episcopal Church; Member of Inverness and Nairn, Badenoch and Strathspey Education Business Partnership; Founder Chair of Highland Community Care Forum and The Princess Royal Trust for Carers Highland Project; Member of the Scottish Tourist Board; Director of Moray, Badenoch and Strathspey Enterprise Company Ltd. Company Member of the Highland Hospice; Director of Voluntary Action in Badenoch and Strathspey Enterprise Company Ltd. Company Member of Scottish Council Y.W.C.A Housing Society (Director 1985 to 1991) now Haven Housing Society; 1982 to 1998 Founder chair of Badenoch and Strathspey Community Advice and Information Service; Chair of Highland Region of the Scottish Pre-Schools Playgroups Association and member of Scottish Committee of Scottish Pre-Schools Playgroup Association; 1977 to 1985 Member of the North of Scotland Electricity Consultative Committee. 

Dysart was appointed a deputy lieutenant of Inverness-shire in 1986, and succeeded his father as 'of Rothiemurchus', in the Cairngorms, in 1987. He has held office in a number of co-operative, land management, nature and conservation organisations since 1975 and was President of the Royal Zoological Society of Scotland from 1996 to 2006. In 2003, his mother Lady Katherine succeeded her elder sister, Lady Rosamund, as Countess of Dysart. Upon her death in 2011, Dysart inherited her titles.

The 13th Earl's wife was killed following a collision with a coach in 2022.

References

External links
Rothiemurchus estate

1946 births
Living people
Deputy Lieutenants of Inverness-shire
Earls of Dysart
People educated at Gordonstoun
Fellows of the Royal Scottish Geographical Society